Anouchka Martin (born 5 February 1993) is a French swimmer. She competed in the women's 4 × 100 metre freestyle relay event at the 2018 European Aquatics Championships, winning the gold medal.

References

External links
 

1993 births
Living people
French female freestyle swimmers
Place of birth missing (living people)
European Aquatics Championships medalists in swimming
Swimmers at the 2020 Summer Olympics
Olympic swimmers of France
20th-century French women
21st-century French women